Mary Evans Birdsong (born April 18, 1968) is an American actress, comedian, writer, and singer. She has worked in the theater and voiceover work and is a regular cast member on Reno 911!

Early life 
Birdsong was born in Florida and grew up on Long Beach Island, New Jersey, one of five sisters. She graduated from Southern Regional High School in 1986.

Career

Film and television 

Birdsong is a graduate of NYU's Tisch School of the Arts where she earned a BFA in acting. She made her on-screen debut in the 1996 TV film Live On Tape. She is best known as Deputy Cherisha Kimball on the comedy series Reno 911! (2005-2007, 2020–present) and it's two spin-off movies in 2007 and 2021. She is also known for playing Nancy McDonald in Rob Zombie's Halloween II and Kai Mitchell opposite George Clooney in the Alexander Payne film The Descendants. She appeared alongside Adrien Brody in the stoner comedy High School (2010), playing Mrs. Gordon, a high school dean's promiscuous wife. She has also made numerous cameos on film and television, including in the major productions Made of Honor and Percy Jackson: Sea of Monsters, and the psychological thriller Buried.  She is a former correspondent on The Daily Show and Crossballs. As a voice actress, she has appeared in animated series such as Goldie and Bear, Stroker and Hoop, Little Bill (as Dorado's mom in the episode "New Foods"), Harvey Birdman: Attorney At Law, Tak & the Power of Juju, T.U.F.F. Puppy and Stroker and Hoop, as well as the video game Grand Theft Auto: Vice City and Command & Conquer 4: Tiberian Twilight, and animated film Beavis and Butt-Head Do the Universe.

Broadway and live theater
From July 2006 to January 2007, Birdsong performed in the Martin Short: Fame Becomes Me comedy musical, alongside Martin Short, Marc Shaiman, Nicole Parker, Brooks Ashmanskas, and Capathia Jenkins, winning a Theatre World Award for her performance. On January 29, 2008, Birdsong joined the Broadway cast of the musical, Hairspray. She played the role of Velma Von Tussle, the bigoted, pushy stage mother and television producer. Birdsong left the production on April 6, 2008. She then performed her one-woman show 3 Days in the Tub: A Mama Drama in Los Angeles at Comedy Central Stage (September 2010) & the Fake Gallery (November 2010), and in New York City at Joe's Pub (January 2011). before going to San Francisco to play Mona Ramsey in ACT's adaptation of Armistead Maupin's Tales of the City. She is also known for her Judy Garland impression.

Together with author Justin Halpern (Shit My Dad Says) and comic Jen Kober (American Reunion), Birdsong performed as a member of the May 2012 cast of Don't Tell My Mother!, an LA-based comedy showcase.

References

External links
 
 
 Interview with WickedInfo.com

Living people
Actresses from New Jersey
American comedy musicians
People from Florida
American film actresses
American impressionists (entertainers)
American musical theatre actresses
American stage actresses
American television actresses
American voice actresses
Women rock singers
People from Ocean County, New Jersey
Southern Regional High School alumni
American women comedians
20th-century American actresses
21st-century American actresses
21st-century American women singers
20th-century American comedians
21st-century American comedians
Theatre World Award winners
1968 births